One for the Road is the third album by Ronnie Lane and his Slim Chance band. Lane had previously been a founding member of Small Faces and Faces. The album was recorded using Ronnie Lane's Mobile Studio.

Track listing
All tracks composed by Ronnie Lane; except where indicated

"Don't Try 'n' Change My Mind" – 3:06
"32nd Street" – 4:34
"Snake" – 3:27
"Burnin' Summer" – 4:06
"One for the Road" – 4:46
"Steppin' and Reelin'" – 6:27
"Harvest Home"  (Lane, Charlie Hart) – 5:50
"Nobody's Listenin'" – 3:54
"G'morning" – 4:01

Personnel
Ronnie Lane – guitar, lead vocals
Slim Chance
Steve Simpson – guitar, mandolin, fiddle, keyboards, harmonica, vocals
Charlie Hart – violin, keyboards, harp, whistle, accordion
Brian Belshaw – bass, vocals
Colin Davey – drums, vocals

Production
Ronnie Lane - producer
George Chkiantz, Ron Fawcus - recording engineer
Chris Thomas - mixing
Nicholas de Ville - cover
Willie Christie - photography
John Tobler - liner notes

References

Ronnie Lane albums
1976 albums
Island Records albums